Agnibeena is the first poetry book written by Kazi Nazrul Islam, one of the most famous Bengali poet of the first half of the twentieth century. It was published in the month of Kartik, the Bengali year 1329 (October, 1922). There are twelve poems in this book.

List of poems
Agnibeena contains a preface where Nazrul dedicated the book to Barindra Kumar Ghosh and 12 poems. The most famous poem of this book is "Bidrohi".
 "Pralayollas"
 "Bidrohi"
 "Raktambor-Dharini Ma"
 "Agamoni"
 "Dhumketu"
 "Kamal Pasha"
 "Anwar"
 "Ranobheri"
 "Shat-el-Arab"
 "Kheyaparer Taroni"
 "Qurbani"
 "Muharram"

References

Kazi Nazrul Islam
1922 poetry books
Bengali poetry